The Eder Flag Manufacturing Company, based in Oak Creek, Wisconsin, is the largest company in America that serves as both a flag and flagpole manufacturer. The company was founded in 1893.  

In June 2015, following the events of the Charleston church shooting, the company announced that it would no longer sell Confederate flags.

References 

Flag manufacturers
1893 establishments in Wisconsin
Companies based in Wisconsin